John Beasley (born 1916), generally known as Jack Beasley, was an English professional footballer who played as a centre forward. He was born in Wednesbury.

Beasley began his professional career with Birmingham, but left to join Torquay United in 1935 without making the first team. He scored on his league debut on 18 January 1936, a 2–1 win at home to Watford, Torquay's other goal coming from Fred Beedall.

He played in the following two games, a 2–0 defeat away to Bristol City and a 3–1 defeat at home to Millwall in which Beasley scored Torquay's goal. Despite scoring he was replaced by Wally Hunt for the next game. He made one further appearance, on 14 April 1936 in a 3–0 defeat away to Bristol Rovers, before leaving for non-league Worcester City, for whom he scored 43 goals in league and cup. He later played for Halesowen Town, signing for them in 1938, when he was noted as being a resident of the town.

References

1916 births
Possibly living people
Sportspeople from Wednesbury
English footballers
Association football forwards
Birmingham City F.C. players
Torquay United F.C. players
Worcester City F.C. players
Halesowen Town F.C. players
English Football League players